This is a list of flag bearers who have represented South Sudan at the Olympics.

Flag bearers carry the national flag of their country at the opening ceremony of the Olympic Games.

See also 
 South Sudan at the Olympics

South Sudan at the Olympics
South Sudan
Olympic flagbearers